A proverb is a simple and concrete saying popularly known and repeated.

Proverb or Proverbs may also refer to:

 Adages in general
 Pro-verb, the pro-form of a verb
 The Book of Proverbs, a book of the Hebrew  Bible and the Christian Old Testament
 Proverb (Reich), a musical composition
 ProVerb (Tebogo Sidney Thapelo Thekisho), a South African rapper

People 
 Proverb Jacobs (1935–2016), American football offensive and defensive lineman
  (born 1971), Barbadian male volleyball player
 Roy Proverbs (1932–2017), English professional soccer player
 Gordon Proverbs (born 1924), cricketer for Barbados from 1949 to 1955

See also
 Anti-proverb, distortions of proverbs (adages)
 Proverbial name, a type of given name formation in some cultures of Africa
 Netherlandish Proverbs, a painting by Pieter Bruegel the Elder.